Che Lovelace (born 1969) is a Trinidadian artist who lives and works in Port of Spain, Trinidad. He first came to prominence as a champion surfer and was appointed president of Trinidad's Surfing Association in 2012. He has contributed to many art, Carnival and entertainment projects, including the weekly Studiofilmclub, founded in 2003 with Peter Doig. Lovelace is currently a lecturer at the University of the West Indies Creative Arts Campus. He is the son of novelist Earl Lovelace.

Biography

Che Lovelace was born in San Fernando, Trinidad, and grew up in the east coast village of Matura. He has said: "My 'passport' name is Cheikh Sedar Lovelace. Apparently, in 1969, the Anglican Church would not allow me to be christened Che. My parents made my first name Cheikh after the African historian-philosopher, Cheikh Anta Diop. I believe Sedar is after the Senegalese poet Léopold Sédar Senghor. Why they set me up to live up to the standard of such great men, I couldn't tell you." Lovelace began surfing in his late teens and achieved prominence through winning national titles in the sport. He was educated at Queen's Royal College, and went on to pursue his interest in art and to train at L'Ecole Régionale des Beaux-Arts de la Martinique in Fort-de-France. 

Working as an artist since he graduated in 1993, Lovelace has experimented with various styles and materials, exploring in his subject matter dancehall, Carnival and dancing figures. In 1998, he was awarded a residency at the Gasworks Gallery, London, in a collaboration with the Institute of International Visual Arts (Iniva), UNESCO's International Fund for the Promotion of Culture, and the Gasworks Studios.

Having been a founder and director of CLAY J'Ouvert, a traditional carnival outfit based in Woodbrook, Port of Spain, Lovelace has gone on to develop with other J'ouvert lovers the "Friends For The Road J'Ouvert" project, honouring the ritual "Mud Mas" experience and featuring traditional masquerade characters.

In 2003, together with Peter Doig, Lovelace co-founded the alternative cinema space Studiofilmclub. Lovelace also lectures at the University of the West Indies Creative Arts Campus.

In 2017, The New Yorker noted: "Poised on the border between Cubism and realism, Lovelace doesn't really belong to any school; part of the beauty of the show lies in watching the artist establish his own rich vocabulary and letting the work stand on its own. He's not afraid of pleasure and knows how much the soul craves color—a refuge during these dark days." Reviewing Lovelace's first exhibition in France in 2017, Le Figaro said that his use of landscape and bright colour recalled that of Gauguin and Matisse.

In a 2018 interview, Lovelace said: "I've seen the landscape in a variety of ways–as a surfer, as a country man growing up in Matura, as an artist in the city, as a participator in cultural events. So I always want my work to reflect that."

Selected solo exhibitions
 2013: Lovers, Y Art Gallery, Woodbrook, Port of Spain
 2016: 8 Paintings, Softbox Studio, St Clair, Trinidad
 2017: Galerie Éric Hussenot, Paris
 2017: Half Gallery, New York
 2018: Recent painting, LOFTT Gallery, Port of Spain (20 July–10 August)
 2019: a PLACE, a PERSON, LOFTT Gallery, Port of Spain (15 November–29 November)
 2021: From the Edge of the Rock, Various Small Fires (VSF), Los Angeles (6 March–17 April)

Work in collections
In 2021, his painting "Nyabinghi Drummers" was acquired by the Museum of Contemporary Art, Los Angeles.

References

External links
 "Sport Insight - Che Lovelace". Video interview with Astil Renn, CNC3, 25 May 2016.
  Stephanie Eckardt, "In the Studio with Che Lovelace, the Painter Putting Trinidad on the Art-World Map", W magazine, 15 March 2021.
 "Che Lovelace" (interview), Super! Retrieved 26 August 2021.
 "A Conversation with Che Lovelace", Cerebral Women Episode 71, 23 June 2021.

1969 births
Living people
Trinidad and Tobago artists
Alumni of Queen's Royal College, Trinidad
21st-century male artists
Trinidad and Tobago surfers
People from San Fernando, Trinidad and Tobago